"Love Myself" is the debut single by American actress and singer Hailee Steinfeld. It was released on August 7, 2015, through Republic Records and Universal Music Group, as the lead single from her debut extended play (EP), Haiz (2015). The song was written by Mattias Larsson, Robin Fredriksson, Oscar Holter, Julia Michaels, and Justin Tranter, with the production being handled by Holter, with Larsson and Fredriksson under their stage name Mattman & Robin.

Lyrically the song centres around self-confidence and has been referred to as an "ode to masturbation" in the media. The song received positive reviews from contemporary music critics who praised Steinfeld's voice and style, comparing positively to Taylor Swift and Selena Gomez. The song also found commercial success, peaking at number 30 on the Billboard Hot 100, number six on the US Dance Club Songs chart and number 15 on the Billboard Pop Songs chart.

Background and release
Steinfeld gained recognition as a singer after performing "Flashlight" in Pitch Perfect 2 (2015) which she also starred in. She signed with Republic Records beginning of 2016. Steinfeld's debut single was released on August 7, 2015. Billboard noted that,The 18-year-old, who showed the world her chops as the standout newcomer in Pitch Perfect 2, brings all the self-confidence a girl could need to the empowering anthem.

Music and lyrics
The song was described as a "sugary, feel-good pop jam". The lyrics to the song include "I'm gonna put my body first/And love me so hard 'til it hurts" and "I'm gonna touch the pain away/I know how to scream my own name"; the music video, released one week later, features Steinfeld wearing a leotard emblazoned with "self service". This prompted many fans and media outlets to dub the song an "ode to masturbation". According to musicnotes.com, the song is written in G minor, with a chord sequence of Cm-Gm-B-Cm-Eb and has a tempo of 120 beats per minute in common time.

Themes and analysis
Vulture writer Dee Lockett noted that Steinfeld "made her ode to masturbation just subliminal enough to fly over a less-involved parent's head, and its sugary TeenNick-appropriate production probably will not raise any suspicions either". She also pointed out a feminist lens of the song saying that if "Love Myself" means the music industry "might finally let young female pop-stars stop pretending that men are the only way they can get off, then Hailee Steinfeld might've just thrown her name into the conversation about pop's new feminist generation".

Steinfeld herself has stated that the meaning of the song is intended to be interpreted by the listener, "but for me it's an empowerment record and it’s ultimately about taking care of yourself and indulging yourself, whether that be emotionally or physically or with material things." Steinfeld noted in an interview with MTV that "there is that sense of fearlessness, which I think kind of came from that word exactly: just being fearless and being able to kind of put myself out there".

Critical reception

Upon release, the track received positive reviews. The Young Folks writer Brooke Pawling Stennet wrote that she "shows great potential through her debut track" calling it a "solid debut for a young Steinfeld now eighteen years old and ready to make a name for herself". She did feel that the 2015-2016 trend for being "body positive" is not captivated in the song but noted that it is still a "fun song that lies in the same vein as the new style that artists like Taylor Swift, Selena Gomez, and One Direction are all pushing towards as they break free of their own invisible chains of adolescent and innocent teeny bop status". The Independent also praised the track saying that it "leaves any listener feeling empowered and happy with themselves". They also called the song "pop bliss" praising Hailee's unique voice and comparing it to Tove Lo and Ariana Grande. They went on to sat that "if this is what [Steinfeld] has to offer on her debut, then she is an artist to look out for".

Vulture writer Dee Lockett also praise the song noting "a glaze to Steinfeld’s vocal style on the track that's unmistakably Swift-influenced. She also compared the song's "down to the shout-sung 'I love me!' hook" to Kendrick Lamar. She also compared the song to Selena Gomez's "Good for You" noting that Steinfeld also "celebrates a sexual awakening". MTV writer Madeline Roth called Steinfeld a "fearless pop star" noting that she "came roaring out the gate with a self-empowerment anthem" which sets "her apart from the pack of pop stars who came before her". She also compared "Love Myself" to the debut singles of Britney Spears, Christina Aguilera, Mandy Moore, Jessica Simpson, Selena Gomez and Taylor Swift ("...Baby One More Time, "Genie In a Bottle", "Candy", "I Wanna Love You Forever", "Come & Get It" and "Tim McGraw" respectively). Roth added that the song is "a strong statement for a 19-year-old to make, and in a way, it's one that only someone as young and optimistic as her could make".

Chart performance
The song peaked at number 30 on the Billboard Hot 100, number six on the US Dance Club Songs chart and number 15 on the Billboard Pop Songs chart. On the latter, the song debuted at number 27, marking the highest debut for a solo female artist on the chart in 17 years, since Natalie Imbruglia's single "Torn" entered at number 26 in 1998.

Usage in media
The song has been featured in multiple soundtracks, films and television shows. In 2015, the song was included on the Jem and the Holograms soundtrack. The song was also featured in Blockers (2018). In a review for the film, Insider writer Kim Renfro commented that "the anthem carried throughout the movie" and that the song "drives the message home". The song has also been played in Love Island, DC's Stargirl, How to Be Single and at World of Dance events.

Music video
The accompanying music video, directed by Hannah Lux Davis, was released on August 14, 2015. The video shows Steinfeld dancing through Los Angeles with several other people.

Track listing
 Digital download
 "Love Myself" – 3:38

 Love Myself (Remixes) – EP
 "Love Myself" (Fareoh Remix - Extended) – 4:47
 "Love Myself" (KREAM Remix) – 3:41
 "Love Myself" (Riddler Remix) – 5:05
 "Love Myself" (Toy Armada & DJ GRIND Club Mix) – 6:11

Credits and personnel

Credits adapted from Qobuz.

Charts

Weekly charts

Year-end charts

Certifications

References

2015 songs
2015 debut singles
Republic Records singles
Universal Music Group singles
Hailee Steinfeld songs
Songs written by Robin Fredriksson
Songs written by Julia Michaels
Songs written by Justin Tranter
Music videos directed by Hannah Lux Davis
Female masturbation
Masturbation in fiction
Songs with feminist themes
Song recordings produced by Mattman & Robin
Songs written by Mattias Larsson
Songs written by Oscar Holter
Song recordings produced by Oscar Holter